Conservatori Superior de Música del Liceu is a music college in Barcelona, Catalonia, Spain. It was created in 1837 with the name Liceo Filo-dramático de Montesión.

In 1847 the institution inaugurated the opera house Gran Teatre del Liceu. In 1854, the Liceo Filarmónico and the Gran Teatre del Liceu separated administratively. Nevertheless, both entities have always remained closely linked.

Among its students have been, among other, artists as: singers Francisco Viñas, Maria Barrientos, Josefina Huguet, Conchita Supervía, Mercedes Capsir, Elvira de Hidalgo, Miguel Fleta, Victoria de los Ángeles, Jaume Aragall, Montserrat Caballé, Manuel Ausensi, José Carreras, Eduard Giménez, Dalmacio González, Juan Pons, Nuria Rial, Josep Bros; guitarist Renata Tarragó; pianist Frank Marshall or composers Leonardo Balada, Lluís Benejam, Agusti Grau Joan Guinjoan, Joan Lamote de Grignon, Ricard Lamote de Grignon, Frederic Mompou, Carles Santos, Manuel Valls, and Joaquim Zamacois. Many of them also became professors there upon completion of their studies, including Renata Tarragó. Among the professors there were Catalan composers Enric Morera, Graciano Tarragó and German composer Engelbert Humperdinck. The Barcelona Guitar Orchestra is based there.

Since 1999 Maria Serrat i Martín has assumed the General Direction and in 2002 the Spanish composer and musicologist Benet Casablancas assumed the academic direction of the Conservatori Superior de Música del Liceu.

External links
Conservatori Superior de Música del Liceu website (in Catalan, Spanish and English)

Conservatori Superior de Música del Liceu
Culture in Barcelona
Educational institutions established in 1837
1837 establishments in Spain
Arts organizations established in 1837